Gray Rocks was a year-round privately owned resort in the Laurentian Mountains of Quebec, Canada, first developed as a ski destination on Sugarloaf Hill (French: Le Pain de Sucre). The ski hill had 22 downhill trails: 4 easy, 10 intermediate, 8 expert (of which 2 were "double diamond"). Also available was a snowboarding park and instruction from the Snow Eagle Ski School.

In warmer seasons, activities included golf with two courses, as well as boating on adjoining Lac Ouimet, swimming (in pool or lake), tennis, horseback riding, bicycling, and hiking.

The resort facilities included a 105-room hotel,  56 condominium units, French cuisine restaurant, and spa.

First opened in 1906, the hotel closed during the Great Recession of 2009; 70% of the main building was destroyed by a suspicious fire on the evening of 25 November 2014.

History
Gray Rocks was established in 1905 by George Wheeler, originally of New Hampshire.  His granddaughter, Lucille Wheeler, won the Bronze Medal for alpine skiing at the 1956 Winter Olympics.

In 1948, Réal Charette, a former World War II winter warfare instructor, became the first Canadian to be appointed a director of a ski school in Canada, the renowned Snow Eagle Ski School at Gray Rocks.

From the mid-1950s to the mid seventies, it was known as the dean of the Laurentian resorts. Many American families came for golf, tennis and swimming in the summer, and ski packages in the winter.

At the end of March 2009, Gray Rocks was closed as both a hotel and ski resort. Of the two golf courses, La Belle closed in 2020 after 100 years in operation; the 2nd, La Bête was taken over by Clublink. Several owners of the condos previously associated with Gray Rocks have created a vacation home rental operation, Lac Ouimet Rentals, that now operates under the name Village des Soleils.

See also
List of golf courses in Quebec

References

Ski areas and resorts in Quebec
Golf clubs and courses in Quebec
Geography of Laurentides
Tourist attractions in Laurentides
Buildings and structures in Laurentides